Italia is an album by Chris Botti that was released by Columbia Records on September 25, 2007. The album focuses on Botti's Italian roots with the title track "Italia" and songs such as "Ave Maria," "Venice," and "Estaté." Botti partnered with Andrea Bocelli on the song "Italia" and performed it with Bocelli during the 2007 concert at the Teatro del Silenzio. The song was released in 2008 on the DVD titled Vivere Live in Tuscany.

Italia reached #1 on the Top Jazz album charts. Later that year, it was nominated for the Grammy Award for "Best Pop Instrumental Album." Italia peaked at #27 on both The Billboard 200 and Top Internet Album charts.

Track listing

Personnel
 Chris Botti - Trumpet

 Andrea Bocelli - Vocal
 Brian Bromberg - Bass
 Billy Childs - Piano
 Paul Clarvis - Percussion
 Vinnie Colaiuta - Drums
 Paula Cole - Vocal
 Shane Fontayne - Electric Guitar
 David Foster - Piano
 James Genus - Bass

 Gil Goldstein - Fender Rhodes
 Isobel Griffiths - Orchestra Contractor
 James Harrah - Guitar
 Jimmy Johnson - Bass
 Billy Kilson - Drums
 Jeremy Lubbock - Arranger, Conductor
 John Lubbock - Choir Conductor
 Dean Martin - Vocal
 Christian McBride - Bass
 Orchestra of St. John's - Orchestra
 Dean Parks - Guitars
 Frank Ricotti - Percussion
 Tom Scott - Soprano Sax
 Randy Waldman - Piano
 Bill Smith - Recording Engineer

Charts and certifications

Weekly charts

Year-end charts

Certifications

References

Chris Botti albums
2007 albums
Columbia Records albums
Instrumental albums
Albums produced by Bobby Colomby